Richard Gasquet was the defending champion, but he lost in the second round to Gaël Monfils. 
Rafael Nadal won the title, defeating Monfils in the final, 6–1, 6–7(5–7), 6–2.

Seeds

Draw

Finals

Top half

Bottom half

Qualifying

Seeds

Qualifiers

Qualifying draw

First qualifier

Second qualifier

Third qualifier

Fourth qualifier

References
 Main draw
 Qualifying draw

Singles